Since becoming a U.S. state in 1959, Alaska has been entitled to one member in the United States House of Representatives, elected in the state's sole, at-large congressional district. By area, Alaska's congressional district is the largest congressional district in the United States, and is the second largest electoral district represented by a single member in the world, behind only Nunavut's sole electoral district in Canada.

On August 31, 2022, Democrat Mary Peltola defeated Republican former governor Sarah Palin in the special election to replace Don Young, who died on March 18. Peltola became the first Democrat elected to the House of Representatives from Alaska since 1972, and the first Alaskan Native to be elected to the United States House of Representatives in history.

It was also one of five districts that voted for Donald Trump in the 2020 presidential election while being won or held by a Democrat in 2022.

History
The district was created when Alaska achieved statehood on January 3, 1959. Alaska is still entitled to only one member in the House of Representatives.

Voter registration

Recent statewide election results

List of members representing the district

Electoral history

1958 to 2010

Source:

2012

2014

2016

2018

2020

2022 special

2022

Notes

References

 
 
 Congressional Biographical Directory of the United States 1774–present

At-large
At-large United States congressional districts
Constituencies established in 1959
1959 establishments in Alaska
Lists of Alaska politicians